John Assheton (fl. 1548) was an Anglican priest.

John Assheton may also refer to:

 John Assheton I (c. 1354–c. 1398), English military commander and MP for Lancashire
 Sir John Assheton II (died 1428), English soldier and MP for Lancashire, son of the above

See also
John Ashton (disambiguation)